Thornloe is a village in the Canadian province of Ontario, located in the Timiskaming District. The village had a population of 112 in the Canada 2016 Census.

Thornloe Cheese Factory 

Thornloe is situated within a fertile farm region in the Temiskaming valley.  The Thornloe Cheese Factory opened in 1940, using locally produced milk for its cheese. The factory and retail store are located on Highway 11 in Thornloe, and it is a popular attraction for tourists. The Thornloe Cheese Factory employs more than 20 full and part-time workers, and purchases over 3 million litres of milk from local farmers.

Demographics 

See also 
 List of francophone communities in Ontario

References 

Municipalities in Timiskaming District
Single-tier municipalities in Ontario
Villages in Ontario